James Francis Edwards, CM, DFC & Bar, DFM, CD (5 June 1921 – 14 May 2022), later known as Stocky Edwards, was a Canadian fighter pilot during World War II. With 19 confirmed aerial victories, Edwards is Canada's highest scoring ace in the Western Desert Campaign.

Early life
Born in Nokomis, Saskatchewan, Edwards grew up in Battleford, Saskatchewan. After graduating from St Thomas College in 1940 he volunteered for the Royal Canadian Air Force (RCAF).

World War II

Sergeant Edwards was posted to 94 Squadron RAF of 223 Wing in January 1942 flying the P-40 "Kittyhawk". On 23 March, he flew his first operational trip, during which he shot down his first enemy aircraft, a Bf 109. In May, he was posted to 260 Squadron, and saw intensive action for the rest of 1942. By September, he had 6 "kills" and was commissioned, jumping four grades to the rank of flight lieutenant. He was awarded a Distinguished Flying Medal and Distinguished Flying Cross by the start of 1943, by which time Edwards was a flight commander. His tour finished in May 1943, total claims made being 17 aircraft shot down and several ground kills; in fact, German records show Edwards underclaimed - 22 victories had been confirmed by German records. One of Edwards' victims during the North African campaign was famous Luftwaffe experten Otto Schulz (51 victories), who was shot down by the Canadian ace on 17 June 1942. On 3 September 1942, Edwards likely damaged Hans-Joachim Marseille's Bf 109 in combat. Marseille was the highest scoring pilot in North Africa, and shot down more Western Allied aircraft than any other German pilot. Three days later, Edwards was the pilot who was believed to have shot down and killed Günter Steinhausen. Though Edwards claimed only a damaged enemy aircraft, it appears this is another victory for which he did not receive full credit.

In November 1943, Edwards was posted to No. 417 Squadron RCAF, then No. 92 Squadron RAF, flying the Supermarine Spitfire VIII; while serving on the Italian front with 92 Squadron, he added three Focke-Wulf Fw 190s and a Bf 109 to his score, all shot down over the Anzio beachhead, three of them on a single day. At the beginning of March 1944, he was posted to the UK, flying operations over Europe with 274 Squadron, a fighter unit equipped, at the end of Edwards' tour, with the Hawker Tempest.

After leave in Canada, Edwards returned to the Western Front, flying Spitfire XVIs as the commanding officer of 127 RCAF Wing in 1945. On 3 May, he shared in the destruction of a Ju 88, just a few days before VE Day. He finished the war with a total of 373 operational sorties without being shot down by the enemy.
 
According to Shores and Williams' Aces High, his final wartime score was 15 + 3 shared destroyed, with 9 more destroyed on the ground. Brown and Lavigne's Canadian Wing Commander credits him with 19 victories, 2 shared, 6.5 probable, 17 damaged and 12 destroyed on the ground. During an interview, Edwards himself specified that he had 19 confirmed victories during the war. Many who flew with him have said that he only reported those "kills" he was certain of and that his real number of aerial victories was probably much higher than officially reported. Eighteen of Edwards' 19 victories, according to Brown and Lavigne, were enemy fighters (14 Bf 109s, 3 Fw 190s and one Macchi 202).

Post-war

Edwards stayed in the RCAF until after amalgamation and retired from the Canadian Forces in 1972 as a lieutenant colonel. In that time, he flew Vampires, Sabres and CF-100s both in Canada and overseas. Edwards was a key player in the post-war air force as his experience and leadership were used to train new pilots.

In 1983, Edwards and Michel Lavigne published a book about his wartime experiences entitled Kittyhawk pilot: Wing Commander J.F. (Stocky) Edwards.

Also in 2009, Edwards was honoured as one of the 100 most influential Canadians in aviation and had his name included with the others on the 2009 CF-18 Centennial of Flight demonstration Hornet.

Edwards died on 14 May 2022, at the age of 100.

Vintage Wings of Canada
As part of their continued effort to honour and commemorate his achievements (along with those of all veterans), Vintage Wings of Canada has decorated their P-40N in the markings flown by "Stocky" in Africa. On 19 September 2009, Vintage Wings took him for a flight over Ottawa in this P-40 giving him a chance to fly it as well.

Vintage Wings has also published stories on Stocky Edwards including the following:
A Visit From A Living Legend.
Flying With The Ace

Decorations
Distinguished Flying Medal
Distinguished Flying Cross (UK) and Bar
Mentioned in Dispatches
Canadian Forces Decoration and Two Clasps
Member of Order of Canada 10 December 2004
Queen Elizabeth II Diamond Jubilee Medal March 2012
Canadian Aviation Hall of Fame member. May 2013 
Legion of Honour, France. Chevalier (Knight). 28 November 2014

References

Ralph, Wayne (2005). Aces, warriors and wingmen: the firsthand accounts of Canada's fighter pilots in the Second World War. John Wiley & Sons Canada Ltd.. .
Tate, Robert. Hans-Joachim Marseille: An Illustrated Tribute to the Luftwaffe's "Star of Africa". Atglen, PA: Schiffer Publishing, 2008. .
Heaton, Colin and Lewis, Anne-Marie Lewis. The Star of Africa: The Story of Hans Marseille, the Rogue Luftwaffe Ace. Zenith Press, London. 2012. 
Hehner, Barbara. The Desert Hawk. Harper-Collins Books, Canada, 2005.

External links
 A biography of Edwards at acesofww2.com
 Century of Flight bio on James F. Edwards
 A detailed biog and informative of the Desert air war in general
 Stocky Edwards Ace Dies

1921 births
2022 deaths
Canadian World War II flying aces
Royal Canadian Air Force officers
Members of the Order of Canada
Recipients of the Distinguished Flying Medal
Royal Canadian Air Force personnel of World War II
People from Rural Municipality Wreford No. 280, Saskatchewan
People from Battleford
Recipients of the Distinguished Flying Cross (United Kingdom)
Canadian Aviation Hall of Fame inductees
Canadian centenarians
Men centenarians